Sarah Mirk (she/they) is an author and journalist based in Portland, Oregon, in the United States.

Education
Mirk attended Grinnell College, graduating in 2008.

Career

She worked for the Portland Mercury from 2008 to 2013. She has also written for Bitch Media.

In 2019, they also undertook the enterprise of making one zine a day, and she then compiled a hundred of them in a self-published book, Year of Zines (2020). They makes their zines freely available to "anyone, especially teachers and educators".

Guantanamo Voices was a New York Times pick for the Best Graphic Novels of 2020. Mirk also teaches a writing class for graduate students at Portland State University's Art + Design program.

Works

Articles

Books
 Oregon History Comics (Know Your City, 2012. Small comic books about Oregon history. Available for free for non-commercial purposes on Mirk's official website.)
Sex from Scratch: Making Your Own Relationship Rules (Microcosm, 2014)
Open Earth (Limerence Press, 2018. A queer sci-fi comic about polyamory, with art by Eva Cabrera and Claudia Aguirre)
Guantanamo Voices: True Accounts from the World’s Most Infamous Prison (Abrams, 2020. Anthology of nonfiction comics)
Year of Zines (self-published, 2020)

Interviews
Nieman Reparts - How comics can enhance reader engagement, bring new audiences to narrative nonfiction.

References

External links

 
 Recent Articles by Sarah Mirk at The Stranger
Articles by Sarah Mirk at Portland Mercury.
Own website

Year of birth missing (living people)
Living people
American women journalists
Journalists from Portland, Oregon
Place of birth missing (living people)
Gerald Loeb Award winners for Audio and Video
21st-century American women